Valerie Landsburg (born August 12, 1958) is an American actress, television and film director, screenwriter, and singer-songwriter. She is best known for her portrayal of Doris Schwartz in the 1982 series Fame, interpreting, for television, the role that Maureen Teefy had originated in the film.  She was also the lead singer on the UK top five hit "Hi Fidelity". Producer Alan Landsburg was her father, and she appeared in at least one installment of True Confessions, an anthology series program he produced.

Biography
Born in New York City to Sally Landsburg, a psychologist and author, and Alan Landsburg. Landsburg made her acting debut in the 1978 movie Thank God It's Friday. In 1980, she took over the role of Libby in Neil Simon's I Ought to Be in Pictures. In 1982, she appeared in the television series Fame. During the series run, Landsburg wrote and directed one episode of the series. Shortly after Landsburg left the show in 1985, she co-starred in two different comedy TV series, which practically ran at the same time. The first, You Again?, starred Jack Klugman, and lasted for one season. From the creators of Cheers, next came the Bess Armstrong series All Is Forgiven, which NBC cancelled after nine episodes. Despite its limited engagement, the series was rebroadcast on the A&E network through 1989, where it gained a broader audience.

Outside of recurring roles in Hotel and Dream On, she appeared in about a dozen TV movies and guest appearances on TV series, including Murder, She Wrote, Beverly Hills, 90210, Empty Nest, Nip/Tuck and The Unit.  In between TV and film projects, she has appeared in stage plays. In addition to acting, Landsburg has directed several feature films and episodic television shows.

In 2001, she released an album of mostly her own compositions, titled Grownup. Among the tracks was a re-recording of "Hi Fidelity".

She is a life member of the Asian Academy of Film & Television.

Filmography

References

External links

1958 births
American women singer-songwriters
American film actresses
American film directors
American women pop singers
American television actresses
American television directors
American women film directors
American women television directors
Jewish American musicians
Living people
American women television writers
American women screenwriters
American television writers
American singer-songwriters
21st-century American Jews
21st-century American women